Maryland Route 550 (MD 550) is a state highway in the U.S. state of Maryland.  The state highway runs  from MD 26 in Libertytown north to Pen Mar Road in Fort Ritchie.  MD 550 runs southeast–northwest across central Frederick County, connecting Fort Ritchie in the northeastern corner of Washington County and Libertytown with the towns of Thurmont and Woodsboro and the smaller communities of Creagerstown and Sabillasville.  South of the highway's junction with U.S. Route 15 (US 15) in Thurmont, the state highway passes through the wide valley of the Monocacy River; to the north, the highway passes along the northern edge of Catoctin Mountain and crests South Mountain near Blue Ridge Summit, Pennsylvania.

MD 550 was built in two main sections.  The highway from Thurmont to Blue Ridge Summit was constructed in the mid-1920s as Maryland Route 81 (MD 81).  MD 81 was extended west to Fort Ritchie in the mid-1930s.  MD 550 was constructed from Libertytown to Woodsboro in the mid to late 1930s.  A second disjoint section of the state highway was built from Creagerstown to Thurmont in the late 1930s.  The two segments of MD 550 were united when the designation was assigned to the highway between Woodsboro and Creagerstown in the mid-1950s.  MD 550 was extended northwest from Thurmont to Fort Ritchie, assuming all of MD 81, in the late 1970s.

Route description

MD 550 begins at an intersection with MD 26 (Liberty Road) in Libertytown.  The state highway heads northwest as two-lane undivided Woodsboro Road through farmland.  MD 550 crosses Cabbage Run, passes through a gap in Laurel Hill, and crosses Israel Creek before reaching Woodsboro.  MD 550 intersects MD 194 (Woodsboro Pike) on the east side of the town; Woodsboro Road continues straight toward the center of town while MD 550 runs concurrently northward with MD 194 on the east side of town.  MD 550 turns west onto Woodsboro Creagerstown Road, which immediately intersects the north end of Main Street, which is unsigned MD 194A.  The state highway intersects the Woodsboro–Taneytown branch of the Maryland Midland Railway and receives the northern end of Creagerstown Road, the old alignment of MD 550, before heading northwest past a quarry shielded from the road by an earthen berm on the northbound side of the highway.

MD 550 continues northwest through farmland and crosses the Monocacy River on its way to Creagerstown.  The state highway passes the historic farmhouses Pennterra and Strawberry Hill before passing through the village, which contains the St. John's Church at Creagerstown Historic District.  MD 550 continues northwest as Creagerstown Road to the hamlet of Jimtown; the highway intersects Moser Road and Hessong Bridge at a four-way stop and turns north onto Jimtown Road.  The state highway enters the town of Thurmont just before the highway intersects MD 77 (Rocky Ridge Road).  The two state highways run concurrently northwest toward downtown Thurmont as Main Street.  In the center of town, MD 550 turns north onto Church Street, which passes under the main line of the Maryland Midland Railway.  The state highway intersects MD 806 (Emmitsburg Road), the old alignment of US 15, before meeting US 15 (Catoctin Mountain Highway) at a diamond interchange.

MD 550 heads northwest out of the town of Thurmont and passes Catoctin High School as Sabillasville Road.  The state highway follows the northern boundary of Catoctin Mountain Park as it starts to wind its way through the narrow valley of Owens Creek between Piney Mountain to the north and Catoctin Mountain to the south, passing under the parallel Maryland Midland Railway line multiple times.  MD 550 leaves Owens Creek in the hamlet of Lantz and passes through the Harbaugh Valley, where the highway crosses Middle Creek, crosses under the railroad, and passes through the village of Sabillasville.  The state highway crosses over Friends Creek then leaves the valley and ascends the eastern flank of South Mountain.  MD 550 passes the Victor Cullen School Power House and the road to the preserved Victor Cullen Center before curving to the west at the top of the mountain, passing within  of the Pennsylvania state line as the highway enters Washington County just south of Blue Ridge Summit.

MD 550 curves to the southwest as Military Road and passes through the communities of Highfield and Cascade.  The state highway intersects MD 491 (Macfee Hill Road) in Fort Ritchie, which contains the former Army base of the same name that is presently being redeveloped.  MD 550 turns north onto Macfee Hill Road and crosses CSX's Hanover Subdivision railroad line at-grade.  At the intersection with the Camp Ritchie Access Road and Pennersville Road, the state highway turns west onto Pen Mar Road.  MD 550 passes under the railroad and reaches its northern terminus just west of Lake Royer.  The highway continues northwest as county-maintained Pen Mar Road, which passes through the community of Pen Mar, home of Pen Mar Park, a former mountain resort.

History

MD 550 was constructed in two main sections: MD 550 between Libertytown and Thurmont, and MD 81 from Thurmont to Fort Ritchie. The first section of the Libertytown–Thurmont portion of MD 550 was constructed as a segment of former MD 72. MD 72 followed Lewistown Road and Old Frederick Road from US 15 at Lewistown east and north through Creagerstown to near Loys Station south of MD 77. The portion of MD 72 through Creagerstown was built in 1926. MD 550 was extended east to Cabbage Run between 1933 and 1935. A second section of MD 550 was started from MD 77 east of Thurmont towards Creagerstown in 1938. This western section was completed in 1939, the same year the eastern section was completed between Woodsboro and Libertytown.

The first section of what would become MD 81 was paved as a state-aid road from the Pennsylvania state line south along Warren Avenue and Cascade Road through Highfield and Cascade by 1910.  The main portion of MD 81 was constructed from Emmitsburg Road (which later became US 15 and is now MD 806) north to Sabillasville around 1923.  The highway was completed to the Pennsylvania state line at Blue Ridge Summit, using what are now Naylor Road and Old Sabillasville Road, around 1927.  The pre-1910 portion of MD 81 in Washington County was reconstructed and extended west toward Pen Mar in 1930.  Military Road was constructed around 1933 between Highfield and Fort Ritchie.  The eastern end of Military Road at the Frederick–Washington county line was tied into a relocation of MD 81 between Sabillasville and Blue Ridge Summit that was completed in 1936.  This bypass included an underpass of the Western Maryland Railway at Sabillasville and resulted in the highway no longer entering Pennsylvania; the old alignment of MD 81 was designated MD 625.

In 1956, MD 72 was removed from the state highway system.  MD 550 was extended southeast through Creagerstown to Woodsboro to connect with the Woodsboro–Libertytown section.  MD 550 was extended through Thurmont, west along MD 77 and north along MD 806, and assumed all of MD 81 in 1977.  Construction on MD 194's bypass of Woodsboro was started in 1995.  When the bypass was completed in 1997, MD 550 was removed from the center of Woodsboro to its present alignment on the northern and eastern sides of town.

Junction list

See also

References

External links

MDRoads: MD 550

550
Maryland Route 550
Maryland Route 550